Centreville is a small community on Cape Sable Island in the Canadian province of Nova Scotia, located in the Municipality of the District of Barrington of Shelburne County.

The Archelaus Smith Museum (1896) in Centreville is on the Canadian Register of Historic Places.

See also
 List of communities in Nova Scotia
 Archelaus Smith
Asa McGray

References

External links
Centreville on Destination Nova Scotia

Communities in Shelburne County, Nova Scotia
General Service Areas in Nova Scotia